Richmond Heights is a census-designated place (CDP) in Miami-Dade County, Florida, United States. The population was 8,944 at the 2020 census.

History

At the beginning of World War II, the United States Navy purchased  of land in southwestern Dade (now called Miami-Dade) County for the purpose of constructing an airship base. The land was owned by the Richmond Timber Company, a major supplier of Dade County Pine (a denser, harder, sub-species of Pinus palustris, or longleaf pine). The base was named Naval Air Station Richmond, after the lumber company, and was home to the 25 ships of ZP-21 (Patrol, Airship Squadron 21 and Airship Wing 2). NAS Richmond was the second largest airship base in the United States, NAS Lakehurst in New Jersey being the largest. NAS Richmond was destroyed by a hurricane and fire in September 1945.

After the end of World War II, Captain Frank C. Martin, a Pan American pilot, purchased farm land adjacent to the base in rural southwest Dade County. With this purchase he created Richmond Heights, as a new community for returning African American veterans.

Of the original  he purchased in 1949, the federal government had used  to build the headquarters of Naval Air Station Richmond, a blimp base constructed in the early months of World War II Richmond, and was eventually home to 25 K-series blimps, three hangars, and 3,000 men. The hangars were 16 stories tall, built of Douglas fir brought in by train. The blimps protected ship convoys in the Florida Straits, and Richmond was the headquarters for the fight against U-boats operating in the Caribbean.

Geography
It is bordered to the north and east by Kendall, to the south by Palmetto Estates, and to the west by Three Lakes.

Demographics

2020 census

As of the 2020 United States census, there were 8,944 people, 2,748 households, and 2,219 families residing in the CDP.

2000 census
As of the census of 2000, there were 8,479 people, 2,653 households, and 2,101 families living in the CDP. The racial makeup of the CDP was 12.45% White (of which 3.4% were Non-Hispanic White,) 82.83% African American, 0.22% Native American, 0.83% Asian, 0.01% Pacific Islander, 2.00% from other races, and 1.65% from two or more races. Hispanic or Latino of any race were 12.47% of the population.

In the Census of 2010, the figures have changed. There were 8,541 people, 2697 households, and 2127 family households living in the CDP. The racial makeup of the CDP was 22.8% White, 72.1% Black or African American; 2.3% belong to other races and 2.8 identified has belonging to more than one race.

As of 2000, there were 2,653 households, out of which 32.5% had children under the age of 18 living with them, 42.4% were married couples living together, 30.1% had a female householder with no husband present, and 20.8% were non-families. 17.9% of all households were made up of individuals, and 8.3% had someone living alone who was 65 years of age or older. The average household size was 3.16 and the average family size was 3.55.

In the CDP, the population was spread out, with 29.0% under the age of 18, 9.0% from 18 to 24, 26.3% from 25 to 44, 21.8% from 45 to 64, and 14.0% who were 65 years of age or older. The median age was 35 years. For every 100 females, there were 83.8 males. For every 100 females age 18 and over, there were 77.9 males.

The median income for a household in the CDP was $38,191, and the median income for a family was $44,095. Males had a median income of $31,286 versus $27,882 for females. The per capita income for the CDP was $15,824. About 14.0% of families and 15.1% of the population were below the poverty line, including 23.0% of those under age 18 and 14.8% of those age 65 or over.

As of 2000, speakers of English as a first language accounted for 87.29% of residents, while Spanish as a mother tongue made up 12.70% of the population.

As of 2000, Richmond Heights had the sixtieth highest percentage of African-American and black residents in the US, with 82.80% of the populace. It had the fifth highest percentage of Bahamian residents in the US, at 1.30% of the population, and the ninety-seventh highest percentage of Cuban residents in the US, at 2.54% of its population (tied with Malone, FL.) It also had the fortieth most Nicaraguans in the US, at 1.04% of all residents (tied with South Miami and Lake Butler, FL.)

Attractions
Annually, people travel back to Miami-Dade County to celebrate the Historic Weekend hosted by the Historic Society.

The Richmond Heights 49ers was funded in part by a grant from the Florida Humanities Council, National Endowment of the Arts, Miami-Dade County Cultural Arts Department, and the Greater Miami Convention & Visitors Bureau.

References 

Census-designated places in Miami-Dade County, Florida
Census-designated places in Florida